Rhine Lana McLin (born October 1948) is an American Democratic politician from Ohio who served as the 54th mayor of Dayton, Ohio from 2002 to 2010. McLin previously served as a member of both chambers of the Ohio General Assembly.

Education 
McLin received her Bachelor of Arts degree in sociology and secondary education from Parsons College and her Master of Education in guidance counseling from Xavier University. She also holds an associate's degree in mortuary science granted by the Cincinnati College of Mortuary Science.

Career 
In 1988, when McLin's father, C. J. McLin, died, Rhine was appointed to serve the remainder of his term in the Ohio House of Representatives. She was then elected to the seat in 1990, and re-elected in 1992. She then was elected to the Ohio Senate in 1994, and re-elected to the senate in 1998. In 2001, McLin was named Minority Leader (completing the term of Ohio senator Ben Espy). She served as Minority Leader until she left the Senate in 2002, barred by term limits from running for re-election again that year. She ran for the office of mayor of Dayton.

McLin was elected mayor of Dayton in 2001, defeating incumbent Republican Michael R. Turner and began serving her term in 2002. She was re-elected in 2005, defeating opponent David R. Bohardt. McLin was an Ohio delegate to the 2000 Democratic National Convention. In 2009, she lost re-election for mayor.

In 1994, McLin became the first African-American woman elected to the Ohio State Senate. She was the first African-American woman to serve as Ohio Senate minority leader. Upon leaving the Senate, she became the first woman to serve as mayor of Dayton. She is the third African-American mayor of Dayton. Finally, in late 2005 she was the first African-American woman to serve as head of the Ohio Democratic Party.

Since 2012, McLin has served as the Vice Chairwoman of the Ohio Democratic Party. In August 2012, McLin was mentioned as a possible candidate to fill the Ohio state representative seat vacated by Clayton Luckie, but she ultimately declined to run.

References

External links
Profile on the Ohio Ladies' Gallery website
Follow the Money - Rhine McLin
2000 1998 1996 Ohio Senate campaign contributions

1948 births
African-American mayors in Ohio
African-American state legislators in Ohio
Central State University faculty
Embalmers
American funeral directors
Living people
Mayors of Dayton, Ohio
Democratic Party members of the Ohio House of Representatives
Democratic Party Ohio state senators
Xavier University alumni
Women mayors of places in Ohio
Women state legislators in Ohio
21st-century American politicians
21st-century American women politicians
20th-century American politicians
20th-century American women politicians
American women academics
20th-century African-American women
20th-century African-American politicians
21st-century African-American women
21st-century African-American politicians
African-American women mayors